Vicky Jewson (born 18 September 1985) is an English screenwriter, producer and film director.

Jewson was born in Oxford, where she still lives. She became interested in making films as a child, and took a five-day course with the Oxford Film and Video Makers at the age of 16.

Films
Her first film, Lady Godiva, an updated version of the legend, was filmed in Oxford and Carcassonne instead of the traditional Coventry after Jewson raised money from friends to fund making it. It was released in January 2008 and received bad reviews. On 19 May that year, coinciding with the film's release on DVD, Jewson organised a charity fund raising event for Maggie's by sponsoring women to ride naked or almost naked through London's Hyde Park.

Jewson's following film, Born of War, a thriller, was co-written by Jewson and Rupert Whitaker and released in 2015.

In January 2018, Jewson's Close, based on the life of the female bodyguard Jacquie Davis, was released and picked up by Netflix. It stars Noomi Rapace and Sophie Nelisse. Jewson again co-wrote the script with Whitaker, to whom she is married.

Awards
In 2006, for her work on Lady Godiva, Jewson won the Arts, Media and Culture category of the first Woman of the Future awards.

References

External links

1985 births
Living people
People from Oxford
English film directors
English screenwriters